Commiphora kataf is a species of flowering plant in the family Burseraceae, native to northeastern and eastern tropical Africa, and the southwestern Arabian Peninsula. A relative of myrrh, local peoples plant this shrubby tree as a resinous hedge that repels wildlife.

References

kataf
Flora of Northeast Tropical Africa
Flora of East Tropical Africa
Flora of Saudi Arabia
Flora of Yemen
Plants described in 1883